Yasin Dülger (born 24 October 1995) is a Turkish football player who plays as a winger for 24 Erzincanspor in the TFF Second League.

Professional career
A youth product of Boluspor, Dülger joined Kasımpaşa on 2 September 2020 after a series of loans. Dülger made his professional debut with Kasımpaşa in a 1-0 Süper Lig loss to Hatayspor on 26 September 2020.

References

External links
 
 
 Mackolik Profile

1995 births
People from Düzköy
Living people
Turkish footballers
Association football wingers
Boluspor footballers
24 Erzincanspor footballers
Nazilli Belediyespor footballers
Kasımpaşa S.K. footballers
Şanlıurfaspor footballers
Süper Lig players
TFF First League players
TFF Second League players
TFF Third League players